Bukhansan Monument, was designated as the 3rd National Treasure of Korea on December 12, 1962.  The stone monument was originally erected at Bibong Peak on Bukhan Mountain.  It was subsequently moved to Gyeongbokgung Palace for safekeeping and is now displayed in the National Museum of Korea.

The rectangular monument is built on a two-story pedestal.  Because the monument was exposed to the elements for 1400 years it has suffered weathering and erosion damage.  It is currently 154 centimeters high and 69 centimeters wide. 

The Bukhansan Monument was rediscovered in 1816 during the reign of Emperor Sunjo by Chusa Kim Jeonghui, a famous calligrapher. 

The monument is valuable for the historical information inscribed on its surface.  There are 12 lines with 32 characters per line in the Haeseoche style of Chinese calligraphy.  The inscription praises the Silla King Jinheung's (540-575 CE) territorial expansion into the Han River valley and commemorates the occasion when the king came and inspected the new borders of his realm.  The inscription explains why the monument was built, describes the achievements of King Jinheung, and also describes the royal retinue.  While the exact date of when the monument was constructed is unclear because the era name is illegible, it is believed that the monument was constructed in 561 CE or 568 CE because the Changnyeongbi Monument and the Hwangchoryeongbi Monument were built on those dates respectively.

See also
National treasures of Korea
Stele

External links
 Cultural Heritage Administration: Bukhansan Monument

Korean culture
National Treasures of South Korea
Silla